TFS may refer to:

Organisations
 Tasmania Fire Service
 Texas Forest Service
 Toronto Fire Services
 Toronto French School

Other uses
 Team Foundation Server, a Microsoft product for collaborative software development projects
 Tenerife–South Airport (IATA code)
 Tramway Français Standard, a type of tram